Denis Thériault (born August 24, 1959) is a Canadian author, playwright and screenwriter of French-Canadian descent..

He graduated in psychology from the University of Ottawa (1981).

Thériault is the author of several plays including La prophétie (1980), Les cloches (1989), and Les Mordus (1990). After winning the Télé-Québec Scenarios Competition twice with Aïrenem (1983), and then Victor le vampire (1984), he began a career as a screenwriter.

Thériault contributed in the writing of several television series including La maison Deschênes (1987–88), Macaroni tout garni (2001 to 2005), Kaboum (2006 to 2010), Les argonautes (2011 to 2013).  His film scripts include Frisson des Collines (2011).

Thériault published his first novel in 2001,  L'iguane (The Boy Who Belonged to the Sea), which won four literary awards. He has since published Le facteur émotif (Canada-Japan Prize), La fille qui n’existait pas, La fiancée du facteur, and Manucure. His novels are translated into many languages, including Russian and Chinese.

Honors and awards

 2001 - France-Quebec Literary Prize - L’iguane (English title: The Boy Who Belonged to the Sea)
 2002 - Anne-Hébert Prize - L’iguane
 2002 - Odyssée Prize - L’iguane
 2006 - Canada-Japan Literary Prize - Le facteur émotif (The Peculiar Life of a Lonely Postman)
 2007 - L’iguane, winner of the Combat des livres de Radio-Canada
 2014 - The Peculiar Life of a Lonely Postman (English translation of Le facteur émotif) selected by the BBC Radio Book Club
 2016 - Hervé-Foulon Prize for L’iguane

Books
 L'Iguane, Montréal, (Québec), Canada, Les Éditions XYZ, 2001, 177 p. / English translation : The Boy Who Belonged to the Sea
 Le Facteur émotif, Montréal, (Québec), Canada, Les Éditions XYZ, 2005 116 p. / English translation : The Peculiar Life of a Lonely Postman
 La fille qui n’existait pas, Montréal, (Québec), Canada, Les Éditions XYZ, 2012, 224 p. / 
 La Fiancée du facteur, Montréal, (Québec), Canada, Les Éditions XYZ, 2016, 174 p. / English translation : The Postman’s Fiancée
 Manucure, Montréal, (Québec), Canada, Leméac Éditeur, 2019, 247p. / English translation : The Manicurist

External links
 

1959 births
Canadian male novelists
Writers from Quebec
Living people
People from Sept-Îles, Quebec
Canadian novelists in French
21st-century Canadian novelists
21st-century Canadian male writers